Stephen, Steven, Steve or Stefan Wong may refer to:
Steve Wong Ka Keung, Hong Kong singer-songwriter and member of Beyond
Stephen Wong Ka-lok (born 1978), Hong Kong actor
Stefan Wong (actor), Hong Kong actor, also known as Stephen Wong
Steven Wong (born 1988), BMX cyclist for Hong Kong
Stephen Wong Yuen-shan (born 1975), Hong Kong politician